The Ambassador from Israel to Finland is Israel's foremost diplomatic representative in Finland

List of Ambassadors

Hagit Ben-Yaakov 2020 -
Dov Segev-Steinberg 2016 - 2020
Dan Ashbel 2011 - 2016
Avi Avraham Granot 2007 - 2011
Shemi Tzur 2003 - 2007
Miryam Shomrat 2000 - 2003
Naftali Tamir 1999 - 2000 
Ali Yahya 1996 - 1999 
Moshe Gilboa 1994 - 1996
Yosef Haseen 1990 - 1994
Asher Naim1988 - 1990
Mordechai Lador 1985 - 1988
Yehuda Horam1981 - 1985
Rehavam Amir 1979 - 1981
Yohanan Cohen 1976 - 1979
Arieh Eilan 1973 - 1977
Katriel Katz 1972 - 1973
Moshe Avidan 1964 - 1968
Yehuda Gaulan 1960 - 1964
Charge d'Affaires a.i.  Eytan Ruppin
Charge d'Affaires a.i.  Avigdor Shoham
Minister Avraham Nissan (Non-Resident, Stockholm) 1950 - 1956

References 

Finland
Israel